For the 1980 Dolly Parton song of the same name see Starting Over Again.

Starting Over Again is a 2015 documentary film directed by Ruggero Gabbai and produced by Elliot Malki. The film is about the exodus of the Egyptian Jews between 1948 and 1956. Filming took place in Paris, London, Milan, New York City, Washington, Tel Aviv, and Jerusalem, starting in 2014. The documentary has been officially selected at the Jerusalem Film Festival of 2015.

Synopsis
"The Egypt of my childhood had a universal flavour and was without conflict, a wide-ranging and inclusive breath that we carry with us like a precious gift." These are the words of the protagonists-witnesses of a golden age, buried beneath the happy sands of the Sahara in the late 1950s, when the Jews of Egypt, settled for centuries, were forced to leave everything behind, their homes in Cairo and Alexandria, their properties, businesses, assets, money, activities, their homeland.
For The Jews of Egypt, the drama unfolded between 1948 and 1956. With the fall of King Farouk, the Arab masses were influenced by Nasserist-Soviet propaganda and guided towards the denial of the past, while Pan-Arabism and the spirit of revanche would eliminate the country's cosmopolitan legacy which dated back to the Ottoman Empire.

Before 1948 kids received a cosmopolitan education and in Cairo there were 33 different schools: the Italian, French, English, Greek, Protestant, Catholic, Jewish, among many others.

The Jews of Egypt and many Europeans were permanently expelled from the country. Twenty pounds to survive were given to each person by the police authorities. The documentary wisely displays the protagonists' will to feed the fire of a new beginning, their persistent strength of resilience and refusal to fold against the events and trauma. It is the same determination that would lead to many of the 80 thousand the Jews of Egypt who left their country (only eight remain today), to build a new life marked by accomplishments, professional excellence and passion for study and culture. The stories of Yves Fedida, Levana Zamir, David Harari, Arturo Schwarz, Roly Cohen, Alec Nacamuli, Ada Aharoni, Sarah Gabbai, Albert and Nissim Malki, Lucette Lagnado, Yvonne Levi and many others, all born in Egypt, are today a wonderful documentary film, Starting over again, directed by Ruggero Gabbai and entirely produced by Elliot Malki.

Production
The film took nine months of work, it has been shot directly in English, Italian and French.  Filming took place in many different locations all around the world, the idea was to show the actual cosmopolitan culture told by the witnesses. Historical footages stagger the historical events, placing in time the testimonies.

Witnesses

 Ada Aharoni 
 Rolando Cohen 
 Maurice de Piciotto 
 Elhamy Elzayat 
 Edwin Fishman 
 Yves Fedida 
 Sarah Gabbai 
 David Hanson 
 David Harari 
 David ‘’Dudi’’ Harari 
 Lucette Lagnado 
 Roland Levy 
 Viviane Levy 
 Albert Malki 
 Nissim Malki 
 Maurice Mizrahi 
 Alec Nacamuli 
 Arturo Schwarz 
 Alessandro Tarabotti 
 Levana Zamir

References

External links
 
 Ricominciare da capo by Fiona Diwan

Italian documentary films
Jews and Judaism in Egypt
2015 films
2015 documentary films